Council Grove High School is a public high school located in Council Grove, Kansas, United States, and operated by Morris County USD 417 school district.  The school serves students in grades 9 to 12 and educates approximately 226 students.  The principal is Jay Doornbos. The school mascot is the Brave Indian and the school colors are blue and gold. Throughout its history, the athletic teams have won several state championships.

Extracurricular activities
Owing to the school's small size, Council Grove offers a relatively small number of clubs and programs. The school is a member of the Kansas State High School Activities Association and is classified as a 3A school. The athletic teams at Council Grove are known as the "Braves". Throughout the school's history, the Braves have won several state championships and have produced a few Division I, Division II, and Division III athletics.

Athletics

State Championships

See also

 List of high schools in Kansas
 List of unified school districts in Kansas

References

External links
 Official Site
 USD 417 School District Boundary Map, KDOT
 Council Grove City Map, KDOT

Public high schools in Kansas
Schools in Morris County, Kansas